Daka may refer to:

Dáka, Hungary
Daka, Malawi
Daka, Burkina Faso
Daka Shoes, a fictional shoe company mentioned in the shows Drake & Josh and iCarly
The Daka skull, a Homo erectus fossil from Dakanihylo, Ethiopia
A male Dakini

See also
 Dakar (disambiguation)
 Dakka (disambiguation)
 Dhaka (disambiguation)